is a song by Japanese musical act Superfly. Used as the theme song for the Fuji Television medical drama Mutsū: Mieru Me, it was released as a digital single on November 18, 2015, and as a physical single on December 2 as "Kuroi Shizuku" & Coupling Songs: 'Side B', a five-song extended play packaged with a B-side compilation album as a bonus disc.

Background and development 

In May 2015, the fifth original album by Superfly was released, White. Taking a year to write, the album was partially recorded in Los Angeles, when vocalist Shiho Ochi traveled there to collaborate with Chris Cester, the former lead singer of Australian Jet. Superfly worked together with American songwriters Jason Hill and Bonnie McKee, as well as Japanese singer-songwriter Bonnie Pink and the poet Bin Sugawara. The album was promoted primarily with the song "Beautiful", which Ochi wrote for the Mother Game: Kanojo-tachi no Kaikyū. Released digitally on May 8, the song was a commercial success, certified Platinum by the Recording Industry Association of Japan. From July 4 to December 14, Superfly performed a 39 date tour of Japan, entitled the White Tour. Part way through the tour, Superfly released McKee's contribution to the album, the ballad "On Your Side", as a post-album single.

Writing and inspiration 

The large single and bonus album package was created to commemorate this release being Superfly's 20th physical single release. This was the second time Superfly had released a package like this, after the drama theme song "Wildflower" and a compilation of Western cover songs, Cover Songs: Complete Best 'Track 3', were compiled together in 2010 to commemorate Superfly's 10th physical single.

"Kuroi Shizuku" was commissioned specifically for the drama Mutsū: Mieru Me. Most of the song was written after the offer was received by vocalist Shiho Ochi, except for the chorus line, which was a pre-existing piece of music from Ochi's song stock. Unlike many of Superfly's singles, Ochi composed the entire song. She was inspired to write the song after reading the text the drama was based on, Yō Kusakabe's 2005 novel Mutsū, influenced by the mysterious atmosphere of the novel. "Kuroi Shizuku" was an exploration of Ochi's darker side that she found while recording White. During the White writing process, Ochi felt free to incorporate new influences that she had not in Superfly's first four albums, which she felt she could continue with for "Kuroi Shizuku". After experimenting with a "sexy" voice for "Iro o Hagashite" from White, Ochi felt inspired to sing in a "wicked woman" voice for "Kuroi Shizuku".

Promotion and release 

On November 18, "Kuroi Shizuku" was released as a stand-alone digital download. Two weeks later, two physical editions of the single were released: the two-CD edition featuring the five-track "Kuroi Shizuku" single with Coupling Songs: 'Side B', as well as a two-CD and DVD edition, additionally featuring a visual recording of Superfly's free live performance at Ōsaka-jō Nishinomaru Kōen on May 30. The "Kuroi Shizuku" single features a cover of Arrows' "I Love Rock 'n' Roll" (1975), which features a guest appearance by the Arrows' member and songwriter Alan Merrill on guitar, who traveled to Tokyo to record his part. Also featured on the single are live recordings of the songs "Beautiful" and "On Your Side" from Superfly's performance at the Tokyo International Forum in September 2015.

The cover artwork was inspired by the title of the song, and features black liquid droplets falling from Ochi's own hair; a recording process that took over two hours to photograph. Ochi wears a dress created from vintage kimono cloth in the cover artwork.

Music video 

The music video was directed by Atsunori Toshi, and was shot in a single 17-hour shoot. It was unveiled publicly on November 25, 2015. The video was themed around black and white, to contrast with the colorful theme of Superfly's most recent studio album, White (2015). It features Ochi doing actions out-of-sync with an ensemble of six masked dancers, who perform a dance incorporating tutting. Ochi is dressed in clothing similar to the clothing she wore in the cover artwork, made from the same re-purposed vintage kimono. Throughout the video, Ochi is shown with the tips of her right hand colored in black; an idea that Ochi created herself.

Track listings

Chart rankings

Sales

Release history

References 

2015 singles
2015 songs
Japanese-language songs
Japanese television drama theme songs
Superfly (band) songs
Warner Music Japan singles